Heliothripoides is a genus of thrips in the family Phlaeothripidae.

Species
 Heliothripoides boltoni
 Heliothripoides reticulatus

References

Phlaeothripidae
Thrips
Thrips genera